Edgar Alexander Ramos Martínez (born September 27, 1979), known as Edgar Ramos, is a Colombian footballer who recently played for
Llaneros.

Notes

External links
elgrafico.com 

1979 births
Living people
Colombian footballers
Colombia international footballers
Independiente Santa Fe footballers
Deportivo Pasto footballers
Deportes Quindío footballers
Patriotas Boyacá footballers
Boyacá Chicó F.C. footballers
Academia F.C. players
Quilmes Atlético Club footballers
Atlético Bucaramanga footballers
Alianza F.C. footballers
Bogotá FC footballers
Llaneros F.C. players
Colombian expatriate footballers
Expatriate footballers in Argentina
Expatriate footballers in El Salvador
Association football defenders
Association football midfielders
Footballers from Bogotá